Ilgın is a Turkish given name. "Ilgın" means "light breeze", and is also the Turkish word for the Tamarix species. Ilgın is a unisex name, though mostly used as feminine.

References 

Turkish feminine given names